was an American artist and landscape architect whose artistic career spanned six decades, from the 1920s onward. Known for his sculpture and public artworks, Noguchi also designed stage sets for various Martha Graham productions, and several mass-produced lamps and furniture pieces, some of which are still manufactured and sold.

In 1947, Noguchi began a collaboration with the Herman Miller company, when he joined with George Nelson, Paul László and Charles Eames to produce a catalog containing what is often considered to be the most influential body of modern furniture ever produced, including the iconic Noguchi table which remains in production today. His work lives on around the world and at the Isamu Noguchi Foundation and Garden Museum in New York City.

Biography

Early life (1904–1922)
Isamu Noguchi was born in Los Angeles, the son of Yone Noguchi, a Japanese poet who was acclaimed in the United States, and Léonie Gilmour, an American writer who edited much of Noguchi's work.

Yone had ended his relationship with Gilmour earlier that year and planned to marry The Washington Post reporter Ethel Armes. After proposing to Armes, Yone left for Japan in late August, settling in Tokyo and awaiting her arrival; their engagement fell through months later when Armes learned of Léonie and her newborn son.

In 1906, Yone invited Léonie to come to Tokyo with their son. She at first refused, but growing anti-Japanese sentiment following the Russo-Japanese War eventually convinced her to take up Yone's offer. The two departed from San Francisco in March 1907, arriving in Yokohama to meet Yone. Upon arrival, their son was finally given the name Isamu ("courage"). However, Yone had married a Japanese woman by the time they arrived, and was mostly absent from his son's childhood. After again separating from Yone, Léonie and Isamu moved several times throughout Japan.

In 1912, while the two were living in Chigasaki, Isamu's half-sister, pioneer of the American Modern Dance movement Ailes Gilmour, was born to Léonie and an unknown Japanese father. Here, Léonie had a house built for the three of them, a project that she had the 8-year-old Isamu "oversee". Nurturing her son's artistic ability, she put him in charge of their garden and apprenticed him to a local carpenter. However, they moved once again in December 1917 to an English-speaking community in Yokohama.

In 1918, Noguchi was sent back to the US for schooling in Rolling Prairie, Indiana. After graduation, he left with Dr. Edward Rumely to LaPorte, where he found boarding with a Swedenborgian pastor, Samuel Mack. Noguchi began attending La Porte High School, graduating in 1922. During this period of his life, he was known by the name "Sam Gilmour".

Early artistic career (1922–1927)
After high school, Noguchi explained his desire to become an artist to Rumely; though he preferred that Noguchi become a doctor, he acknowledged Noguchi's request and sent him to Connecticut to work as an apprentice to his friend Gutzon Borglum. Best known as the creator of Mount Rushmore National Memorial, Borglum was at the time working on the group called Wars of America for the city of Newark, New Jersey, a piece that includes forty-two figures and two equestrian sculptures.  As one of Borglum's apprentices, Noguchi received little training as a sculptor; his tasks included arranging the horses and modeling for the monument as General Sherman. He did, however, pick up some skills in casting from Borglum's Italian assistants, later fashioning a bust of Abraham Lincoln. At summer's end, Borglum told Noguchi that he would never become a sculptor, prompting him to reconsider Rumely's prior suggestion.

He then traveled to New York City, reuniting with the Rumely family at their new residence, and with Dr. Rumely's financial aid enrolled in February 1922 as a premedical student at Columbia University. Soon after, he met the bacteriologist Hideyo Noguchi, who urged him to reconsider art, as well as the Japanese dancer Michio Itō, whose celebrity status later helped Noguchi find acquaintances in the art world. Another influence was his mother, who in 1923 moved from Japan to California, then later to New York.

In 1924, while still enrolled at Columbia, Noguchi followed his mother's advice to take night classes at the Leonardo da Vinci Art School. The school's head, Onorio Ruotolo, was immediately impressed by Noguchi's work. Only three months later, Noguchi held his first exhibit, a selection of plaster and terracotta works. He soon dropped out of Columbia University to pursue sculpture full-time, changing his name from Gilmour (the surname he had used for years) to Noguchi.

After moving into his own studio, Noguchi found work through commissions for portrait busts, he won the Logan Medal of the Arts. During this time, he frequented avant garde shows at the galleries of such modernists as Alfred Stieglitz and J. B. Neuman, and took a particular interest in a show of the works of Romanian-born sculptor Constantin Brâncuși.

In late 1926, Noguchi applied for a Guggenheim Fellowship. In his letter of application, he proposed to study stone and wood cutting and to gain "a better understanding of the human figure" in Paris for a year, then spend another year traveling through Asia, exhibit his work, and return to New York. He was awarded the grant despite being three years short of the age requirement.

Early travels (1927–1937)
Noguchi arrived in Paris in April 1927 and soon afterward met the American author Robert McAlmon, who brought him to Constantin Brâncuși's studio for an introduction. Despite a language barrier between the two artists (Noguchi barely spoke French, and Brâncuși did not speak English), Noguchi was taken in as Brâncuși's assistant for the next seven months. During this time, Noguchi gained his footing in stone sculpture, a medium with which he was unacquainted, though he would later admit that one of Brâncuși's greatest teachings was to appreciate "the value of the moment". Meanwhile, Noguchi found himself in good company in France, with letters of introduction from Michio Itō helping him to meet such artists as Jules Pascin and Alexander Calder, who lived in the studio of Arno Breker. They became friends and Breker did a bronze bust of Noguchi.

Noguchi only produced one sculpture – his marble Sphere Section – in his first year, but during his second year he stayed in Paris and continued his training in stoneworking with the Italian sculptor Mateo Hernandes, producing over twenty more abstractions of wood, stone and sheet metal. Noguchi's next major destination was to be India, from which he would travel east; he arrived in London to read up on Oriental Sculpture, but was denied the extension to the Guggenheim Fellowship he needed.

In February 1929, he left for New York City. Brâncuși had recommended that Noguchi visit Romany Marie's café in Greenwich Village. Noguchi did so and there met Buckminster Fuller, with whom he collaborated on several projects, including the modeling of Fuller's Dymaxion car.

Upon his return, Noguchi's abstract sculptures made in Paris were exhibited in his first one-man show at the Eugene Schoen Gallery. After none of his works sold, Noguchi altogether abandoned abstract art for portrait busts in order to support himself. He soon found himself accepting commissions from wealthy and celebrity clients. A 1930 exhibit of several busts, including those of Martha Graham and Buckminster Fuller, garnered positive reviews, and after less than a year of portrait sculpture, Noguchi had earned enough money to continue his trip to Asia.

Noguchi left for Paris in April 1930, and two months later received his visa to ride the Trans-Siberian Railway. He opted to visit Japan first rather than India, but after learning that his father Yone did not want his son to visit using his surname, a shaken Noguchi instead departed for Beijing. In China, he studied brush painting with Qi Baishi, staying for six months before finally sailing for Japan. Even before his arrival in Kobe, Japanese newspapers had picked up on Noguchi's supposed reunion with his father; though he denied that this was the reason for his visit, the two did meet in Tokyo. He later arrived in Kyoto to study pottery with Uno Jinmatsu. Here he took note of local Zen gardens and haniwa, clay funerary figures of the Kofun period which inspired his terracotta The Queen.

Noguchi returned to New York amidst the Great Depression, finding few clients for his portrait busts. Instead, he hoped to sell his newly produced sculptures and brush paintings from Asia. Though very few sold, Noguchi regarded this one-man exhibition (which began in February 1932 and toured Chicago, the west coast, and Honolulu) as his "most successful". Additionally, his next attempt to break into abstract art, a large streamlined figure of dancer Ruth Page entitled Miss Expanding Universe, was poorly received. In January 1933 he worked in Chicago with Santiago Martínez Delgado on a mural for Chicago's Century of Progress Exposition, then again found a business for his portrait busts; he moved to London in June hoping to find more work, but returned in December just before his mother Leonie's death.

Beginning in February 1934, Noguchi began submitting his first designs for public spaces and monuments to the Public Works of Art Program. One such design, a monument to Benjamin Franklin, remained unrealized for decades. Another design, a gigantic pyramidal earthwork entitled Monument to the American Plow, was similarly rejected, and his "sculptural landscape" of a playground, Play Mountain, was personally rejected by Parks Commissioner Robert Moses. He was eventually dropped from the program, and again supported himself by sculpting portrait busts. In early 1935, after another solo exhibition, the New York Sun's Henry McBride labeled Noguchi's Death, depicting a lynched African-American, as "a little Japanese mistake". That same year he produced the set for Frontier, the first of many set designs for Martha Graham.

After the Federal Art Project started up, Noguchi again put forth designs, one of which was another earthwork chosen for the New York City airport entitled Relief Seen from the Sky; following further rejection, Noguchi left for Hollywood, where he again worked as a portrait sculptor to earn money for a sojourn in Mexico. Here, Noguchi was chosen to design his first public work, a relief mural for the Abelardo Rodriguez market in Mexico City. The 20-meter-long History as Seen from Mexico in 1936 was hugely political and socially conscious, featuring such modern symbols as the Nazi swastika, a hammer and sickle, and the equation E = mc². Noguchi also met Frida Kahlo during this time and had a brief but passionate affair with her; they remained friends until her death.

Further career in the United States (1937–1948)
Noguchi returned to New York in 1937. He designed the Zenith Radio Nurse, the iconic original baby monitor now held in many museum collections. The Radio Nurse was Noguchi's first major design commission and he called it "my only strictly industrial design".

He again began to turn out portrait busts, and after various proposals was selected for two sculptures. The first of these, a fountain built of automobile parts for the Ford Motor Company's exhibit at the 1939 New York World's Fair, was thought of poorly by critics and Noguchi alike but nevertheless introduced him to fountain-construction and magnesite. Conversely, his second sculpture, a nine-ton stainless steel bas-relief entitled News, was unveiled over the entrance to the Associated Press building at the Rockefeller Center in April 1940 to much praise. Following further rejections of his playground designs, Noguchi left on a cross-country road trip with Arshile Gorky and Gorky's fiancée in July 1941, eventually separating from them to go to Hollywood.

Following the attack on Pearl Harbor, anti-Japanese sentiment was energized in the United States, and in response Noguchi formed "Nisei Writers and Artists for Democracy". Noguchi and other group leaders wrote to influential officials, including the congressional committee headed by Representative John H. Tolan, hoping to halt the internment of Japanese Americans; Noguchi later attended the hearings but had little effect on their outcome. He later helped organize a documentary of the internment, but left California before its release; as a legal resident of New York, he was allowed to return home. He hoped to prove Japanese-American loyalty by somehow helping the war effort, but when other governmental departments turned him down, Noguchi met with John Collier, head of the Office of Indian Affairs, who persuaded him to travel to the internment camp located on an Indian reservation in Poston, Arizona, to promote arts and crafts and community.

Noguchi arrived at the Poston camp in May 1942, becoming its only voluntary internee. Noguchi first worked in a carpentry shop, but his hope was to design parks and recreational areas within the camp. Although he created several plans at Poston, among them designs for baseball fields, swimming pools, and a cemetery, he found that the War Relocation Authority had no intention of implementing them. To the WRA camp administrators he was a troublesome interloper from the Bureau of Indian Affairs, and to the internees he was an agent of the camp administration. Many did not trust him and saw him as a spy. He had found nothing in common with the Nisei, who regarded him as a strange outsider.

In June, Noguchi applied for release, but intelligence officers labeled him as a "suspicious person" due to his involvement in "Nisei Writers and Artists for Democracy". He was finally granted a month-long furlough on November 12, but never returned; though he was granted a permanent leave afterward, he soon afterward received a deportation order. The Federal Bureau of Investigation, accusing him of espionage, launched into a full investigation of Noguchi which ended only through the American Civil Liberties Union's intervention. Noguchi would later retell his wartime experiences in the British World War II television documentary series The World at War.

Upon his return to New York, Noguchi took a new studio in Greenwich Village. Throughout the 1940s, Noguchi's sculpture drew from the ongoing surrealist movement; these works include not only various mixed-media constructions and landscape reliefs, but lunars – self-illuminating reliefs – and a series of biomorphic sculptures made of interlocking slabs. The most famous of these assembled-slab works, Kouros, was first shown in a September 1946 exhibition, helping to cement his place in the New York art scene.

In 1947 he began a relationship with Herman Miller of Zeeland, Michigan. This relationship was to prove very fruitful, resulting in several designs that have become symbols of the modernist style, including the iconic Noguchi table, which remains in production today. Noguchi also developed a relationship with Knoll, designing furniture and lamps. During this period he continued his involvement with theater, designing sets for Martha Graham's Appalachian Spring and John Cage and Merce Cunningham's production of The Seasons. Near the end of his time in New York, he also found more work designing public spaces, including a commission for the ceilings of the Time-Life headquarters.

In March 1949, Noguchi had his first one-person show in New York since 1935 at the Charles Egan Gallery. In September 2003, The Pace Gallery held an exhibition of Noguchi's work at their 57th Street gallery. The exhibition, entitled 33 MacDougal Alley: The Interlocking Sculpture of Isamu Noguchi, featured eleven of the artist’s interlocking sculptures. This was the first exhibition to illustrate the historical significance of the relationship between MacDougal Alley and Isamu Noguchi’s sculptural work.

Bollingen Fellowship and life in Japan (1948–1952)

Following the suicide of his artist friend Arshile Gorky in 1948, and a failed romantic relationship with Nayantara Pandit (the niece of Indian nationalist Jawaharlal Nehru), Noguchi applied for a Bollingen Fellowship to travel the world, proposing to study public space as research for a book about the "environment of leisure".

Later years (1952–1988)

In his later years Noguchi gained in prominence and acclaim, installing his large-scale works in many of the world's major cities.

He was married to the ethnic-Japanese icon of Chinese song and cinema Yoshiko Yamaguchi, between 1952 and 1957.

In 1955, he designed the sets and costumes for a controversial theatre production of King Lear starring John Gielgud.

In 1962, he was elected to membership in the American Academy of Arts and Letters.

In 1971, he was elected a fellow of the American Academy of Arts and Sciences.

In 1986, he represented the United States at the Venice Biennale, showing a number of his Akari light sculptures.

In 1987, he was awarded the National Medal of Arts.

Isamu Noguchi died on December 30, 1988, at the age of 84 at New York University Medical Center of heart failure. In its obituary for Noguchi, The New York Times called him "a versatile and prolific sculptor whose earthy stones and meditative gardens bridging East and West have become landmarks of 20th-century art".

Notable works

 Martha Graham (1929), Honolulu Museum of Art, Honolulu, Hawaii
 Tsuneko-san (1931), Honolulu Museum of Art
 Lunar Landscape (1943–44),  now at Crystal Bridges Museum of American Art
 Coffee Table (1944), designed this iconic item of Mid-century Modern furniture
 Texas Sculpture (1960–1961), First National Bank of Fort Worth Plaza, Fort Worth, Texas
 Decorative railings for a bridge in Peace Park (1951–1952), Hiroshima, Japan
 666 Fifth Avenue Ceiling and Waterfall, also known as Landscape of the Cloud (1956–1958), formerly in the lobby of 666 Fifth Avenue, New York City
 Gardens for UNESCO, UNESCO Headquarters (1956–1958), Paris, France
Floor Frame (1962), The White House Rose Garden, Washington, DC
 The Cry (1962), Albright–Knox Art Gallery, Buffalo, New York
 Sun (1963), The Governor Nelson A. Rockefeller Empire State Plaza Art Collection, Albany, New York
 Sunken Garden for Beinecke Rare Book and Manuscript Library (1960–1964), Yale University, New Haven, Connecticut
 Sunken Garden for Chase Manhattan Bank Plaza (1961–1964), New York City
 Gardens for IBM Headquarters (1964), Armonk, New York
 Billy Rose Sculpture Garden (1960–1965), Israel Museum, Jerusalem
 Children's Land (1965–1966), a temporary children's playground for Kodomo no Kuni, Yokohama, Japan
 Red Cube (1968), HSBC Building, New York City
 Octetra (1968), Crystal Bridges Museum of American Art. It was first located near Spoleto Cathedral It is an abstract painted concrete sculpture.
 Untitled Red (1965–66), Honolulu Museum of Art
 Sky Viewing Sculpture (1969), Western Washington University Public Sculpture Collection, Bellingham, Washington
 Black Sun (1969), Volunteer Park, Seattle, Washington
 Expo '70 Fountains, Osaka, Japan
 Twin Sculptures, Bayerische Vereins Bank, Munich (1970–1972), Munich, Germany
 Playscapes, Piedmont Park, Atlanta, Georgia (1975–1976), a children's playground in Atlanta, Georgia
 Intetra (1976), Society of the Four Arts, Palm Beach, Florida
 Portal (1976), Justice Center Complex, Cleveland, Ohio
 Sky Gate (1976–1977), Honolulu Hale, Honolulu, Hawaii
 Dodge Fountain (1972–1979) and Philip A. Hart Plaza in Detroit, Michigan (created in collaboration with Shoji Sadao)
 Untitled (1981), obsidian and wood sculpture, Honolulu Museum of Art
 California Scenario and Spirit of the Lima Bean (1980–1982), Noguchi Garden, Costa Mesa, California
 To the Issei (1980-1983), Noguchi Plaza, Los Angeles, California
 Bolt of Lightning...A Memorial to Benjamin Franklin (conceived 1933, installed 1984), Franklin Square, Philadelphia, Pennsylvania
 Constellation for Louis Kahn (1983), Kimbell Art Museum, Fort Worth, Texas
 Lillie and Hugh Roy Cullen Sculpture Garden (1986) for the Museum of Fine Arts, Houston, Texas
 Bayfront Park (1980–1996), Miami, Florida
 Moerenuma Park (2004), Sapporo, Japan

His final project was the design for Moerenuma Park, a  park in Sapporo, Japan. Designed in 1988 shortly before his death, it was completed and opened to the public in 2004.

Gallery

Honors
Noguchi received the Edward MacDowell Medal for Outstanding Lifetime Contribution to the Arts in 1982; the National Medal of Arts in 1987; and the Order of the Sacred Treasure from the Japanese government in 1988.

In 2004, the US Postal Service issued a 37-cent stamp honoring Noguchi.

Legacy

The Isamu Noguchi Foundation and Garden Museum is devoted to the preservation, documentation, presentation, and interpretation of the work of Isamu Noguchi. It is supported by a variety of public and private funding bodies. The US copyright representative for the Isamu Noguchi Foundation and Garden Museum is the Artists Rights Society. In 2012, it was announced that, in order to reduce liability, Noguchi's catalogue raisonné would be published as an online-only, ever-modifiable work-in-progress.

Exhibition

M+ [1] in partnership with the Isamu Noguchi Foundation and Garden Museum organized an exhibition of Isamu Noguchi and Danh Vō. Noguchi for Danh Vo: Counterpoint(Nov 16, 2018 - April 22, 2019) The exhibition take place in the M+ Pavilion, Hong Kong.

See also

 Wabi-sabi
 Japanese in New York City

Notes

References
 
 
 
 Marika Herskovic, American Abstract Expressionism of the 1950s An Illustrated Survey, (New York School Press, 2003.) . p. 254–257
 Marika Herskovic, New York School Abstract Expressionists Artists Choice by Artists, (New York School Press, 2000.) . p. 39; p. 270–273
Lifetime Honors – National Medal of Arts.
Kenjiro Okazaki, A Place to Bury Names（about Isamu Noguchi and Shirai Seiichi）

Further reading
 Altshuler, Bruce (1995). Isamu Noguchi (Modern Masters). Abbeville Press, Inc.  .
Ashton, Dore; Hare, Denise Brown (1993). Noguchi East and West. University of California Press. 
 Cort, Louise Allison, Bert Winther-Tamaki. Isamu Noguchi and modern Japanese ceramics: a close embrace of the earth,  Washington, DC: Arthur M. Sackler Gallery, Smithsonian Institution; Berkeley: University of California Press, 2003.
 Herrera, Hayden. Listening To Stone: The Art and Life of Isamu Noguchi. Farrar, Straus, and Giroux. New York. 2015.
 Lyford, Amy. Isamu Noguchi's Modernism: Negotiating Race, Labor, and Nation, 1930–1950 (University of California Press; 2013) 288 pages
 Noguchi, Isamu et al. (1986). Space of Akari and Stone. Chronicle Books. .
 
 Torres, Ana Maria; Williams, Tod (2000). Isamu Noguchi: A Study of Space. The Monticelli Press. .
 Winther-Tamaki, Bert. Art in the encounter of nations: Japanese and American artists in the early postwar years.   Honolulu: University of Hawai’i Press, 2001.
 Weilacher, Udo: "Isamu Noguchi: Space as Sculpture", in: Weilacher, Udo (1999): Between Landscape Architecture and Land Art, Birkhauser Publisher. .

External links

The Isamu Noguchi Foundation and Garden Museum
Drawings by Isamu Noguchi from the University of Michigan Museum of Art

 

1904 births
1988 deaths
 
Abstract expressionist artists
American furniture designers
American landscape and garden designers
American artists of Japanese descent
American landscape architects
Modernist designers
Japanese-American internees
Kyoto laureates in Arts and Philosophy
People from Tokyo
People from Yokohama
Artists from Los Angeles
People from Greenwich Village
Columbia College (New York) alumni
Art Students League of New York people
United States National Medal of Arts recipients
Recipients of the Order of the Sacred Treasure
Artists from New York City
20th-century American sculptors
20th-century American male artists
American male sculptors
Treasury Relief Art Project artists
National Sculpture Society members
Sculptors from California
Sculptors from New York (state)